Del Arno Band is a Serbian and Yugoslav reggae band formed in Belgrade in 1986. Del Arno Band are one of the pioneers of Serbian and Yugoslav reggae scenes and are considered the longest-lasting reggae band of former Yugoslavia.

History

1980s
Brothers Jovan (vocals) and Vladan Matić (guitar), fans of reggae music, formed a ten-piece band in 1986, naming it Del Arno Band. After a series of successful live appearances, the band participated in the 1988 Festival Omladina, entering the finals and eventually appearing on the festival The Best of 237 various artists compilation with the song "Ne radim". This was their discography debut, recorded in the lineup which, beside the two, also featured Aleksandar Radosavljević (guitar), Miodrag Vidić (bass guitar), Dragan Vidojević (drums), Vladimir Lešić (percussion), Bruno Garotić (saxophone), Vladimir Vranić (trumpet) and Slobodan Grozdanović (trombone).

1990s
During the early 1990, the band released their debut album, Igraj dok te ne sruše (Dance Until They Break You Down), released on compact cassette only, which beside their material also featured a cover version of the Burning Spear track with lyrics in Serbian language entitled "Ljudi dobre volje" ("People of Good Will"). The album was produced by the band themselves with the help of Miroslav Cvetković. The following year, they released a single featuring the songs "Bi-Bap" ("Be-Bop") and "Putujem" ("I Am Travelling").

The recording of the concert held at the Belgrade SKC on 21 February 1992 was released on the live album Godina majmuna (The Year of the Monkey), featuring quotations from reggae songs included into their own material and a cover version of starogradska muzika standard "Čamac na Tisi" ("A Boat on the Tisa") by Darko Kraljić. During the same year, most of the band personnel had left the band, however, they managed to ensure a continuity in their work by releasing a compilation album Geneza (Genesis), featuring two newly recorded songs, "Iza ugla" ("Behind the Corner") and "DAB in dub", in 1993. The following year, a recording of an acoustic version of their song "Ima mesta za sve" ("There is a Place for Everyone"), performed at an unplugged festival held in January 1994, appeared on the live various artists unplugged album Bez struje (Unplugged), released by MTS Records.

After a long work break, and in a new lineup, the Matić brothers reformed Del Arno Band, releasing the album Reggaeneracija (Reggaeneration), during the late 1995 in the lineup: Jovan Matić "Yo-Van" (vocals, percussion), Vladan Matić (vocals, guitar, keyboards), Dejan Utvar (drums), Darko Golić (bass guitar), Milan Petrić "Puroni" (percussion), Đorde Ćurčić (guitar), Aleksandar Petković (saxophone), Nemanja Kojić (trombone), Dobroslav Predić (trumpet), Zoja Borovčanin (backing vocals, violin) and Abu El Rub (backing vocals, flute). As guest on the album appeared Ekatarina Velika keyboardist Margita Stefanović, the band Pachamama, the Paganke trio and Sunshine vocalist Bane Bojović. On the album the band introduced diverse musical influences into the material, also present in the cover version of the Haustor song "Treći svijet" ("The Third World"), expanded with traditional music influences.

The following year, the band performed at the reprise of the Sun Splash reggae festival in Slovenia, also featuring prominent English reggae bands. During the late 1996, the band appeared on the Kornelije Kovač solo album Moja generacija (My Generation) with a cover version of the Korni Grupa song "Oj, dodole". They also participated the recording of a new version of the Serbian rapper Gru hit song "5ak" (a pun for "Friday"), released by Komuna on the compilation album Time Out in 1997. Two years later, in the Spring of 1999, during the NATO bombing of Yugoslavia, the band often held free afternoon concerts at the Belgrade KST club.

2000s

In 2001, the band released the compilation album Retrospective, consisting of a selection of the most popular songs, demo recordings from the early phases and live material. In 2002, the band appeared on the Milan Mladenović tribute album Kao da je bilo nekad... Posvećeno Milanu Mladenoviću with a cover of Ekatarina Velika song "Novac u rukama" ("Money in My Hands").

In 2006, after a long work break, the band released their third studio album Vreme vode (Time of the Water), released by Automatik Records. The album featured the material composed by the Matić brothers and recorded in a lineup which beside them also featured Veroljub Spasić (a former Petar Pan member, drums), Marko Cvetković (bass guitar), Marin Petrić (percussion), Milan Petrović (keyboards), Đorde Ćurčić (guitar), Mihajlo Bogosavljević (trombone), Dobroslav Petrović (trumpet), Aleksandar Petković (saxophone), Tatjana Popović (backing vocals) and Tatjana Šaletić (backing vocals).

2010s
On 6 February 2011 the band performed at the Belgrade KST club in order to celebrate the 66 years since the birth of Bob Marley as well as the 50th birthday of the band frontman Jovan Matić and the band's 25th anniversary. On 10 June 2011 they released the single "Horoskop" ("Horoscope"). In December 2011, the band was awarded with the New Optimism Award, given by the New Optimism Movement from Zrenjanin, and held an unplugged performance on the award ceremony. On 29 September 2012 Del Arno Band performed in Belgrade Youth Center, on a celebration of the 50th anniversary of Jamaica's independence. In 2015, the band recorded the song "Misli" ("Thoughts") for the various artists album Hronično neumroni (Chronically Restless), on which various artists recorded songs on lyrics by poet Milan B. Popović.

The band celebrated 30 years of activity with the release of the box set Igraj dok te ne sruše — 30 godina (Dance Until They Break You Down — 30 Years). The five-piece box set, released in December 2016, features the band's three studio albums and one live album, as well as a disc with covers and duets originally appearing on various releases and previously unreleased material, including a cover of Ekatarina Velika song "Novac u rukama" ("Money in My Hands"), a cover of Riblja Čorba song "Pravila, pravila" ("Rules, Rules") and a cover of Laza Ristovski instrumental "Marija". The box set also features a book with rare photographs and texts by various rock critics.

In January 2019, the band will release their fourth studio album, Ako ne znaš šta da radiš (If You Don't Know What to Do) through Mascom Records. The album was previously announced by two singles, "Ljut sam" ("I'm Angry"), released in October 2016, and "Još uvek ima nade" ("There Is Still Hope"), recorded with their former member Nemanja "Hornsman Coyote" Kojić (who, after leaving Del Arno Band, fronted successful band Eyesburn and pursues a significant career in various reggae bands and projects ), released in June 2017.

Discography

Studio albums
 Igraj dok te ne sruše (1989)
 Reggaeneracija (1995)
 Vreme vode (2006)
 Ako ne znaš šta da radiš (2019)

Live albums
 Godina majmuna (1992)

Compilation albums
 Geneza (1993)
 Retrospective (2001)

Box sets
Igraj dok te ne sruše — 30 godina

Singles 
 "Bi-bap" / "Putujem" (1991)

Other appearances
 "Ne radim" (Best of 237; 1988)
 "Ima mesta za sve" (Bez struje; 1994)
 "Oj, dodole" (Moja generacija; 1996)
 "5ak" (with Gru; Time Out; 1997)
 "Novac u rukama" (Kao da je bilo nekad... Posvećeno Milanu Mladenoviću; 2002)

References

 EX YU ROCK enciklopedija 1960-2006'', Janjatović Petar;

External links
 Official site
 Del Arno Band at MySpace
 Del Arno Band at Facebook
 Del Arno Band Fan Page at Facebook
 Del Arno Band at YouTube
 Del Arno Band at Discogs
 Del Arno Band at Rateyourmusic
 Del Arno Band at Last.fm
 Del Arno Band at B92.fm

Serbian reggae musical groups
Serbian pop rock music groups
Yugoslav rock music groups
Musical groups established in 1986